Mark Frederick Bruener (born September 16, 1972) is a former American football tight end of the National Football League (NFL), and a current college scout for the Pittsburgh Steelers. He was drafted by the Pittsburgh Steelers 27th overall in the 1995 NFL Draft. He played college football at the University of Washington.

Bruener played nine seasons with the Steelers followed by five with the Houston Texans. He retired following the 2008 season.  He formerly served on the NFL Players Association Executive Committee. As of 2018, he serves as a scout for the Steelers.

College career
Bruener played at the University of Washington from 1991-1994 and proved himself as a reliable receiver and willing blocker in the running game.

1991: 5 catches for 57 yards.
1992: 21 catches for 210 yards.
1993: 30 catches for 414 yards with 3 TD.
1994: 34 catches for 331 yards with 1 TD.

Professional career
Bruener was drafted 27th overall in the 1995 NFL Draft by the Pittsburgh Steelers. He played with the Steelers for nine seasons before signing with the Houston Texans. Bruener was primarily a blocking tight end rather than a pass-catcher, and finished his NFL career with 152 catches.

Personal life
Bruener and his wife Traci live in Washington with their two daughters, Allie and Chloe, and three sons, Carson, Braydon, and Hudson. Bruener is Catholic.

References

External links
 Houston Texans bio

1972 births
Living people
People from Aberdeen, Washington
American football tight ends
American Roman Catholics
Players of American football from Washington (state)
Washington Huskies football players
Pittsburgh Steelers players
Houston Texans players
Ed Block Courage Award recipients